Eileen Glisan is a professor of Spanish language and Spanish language education at Indiana University of Pennsylvania. She was elected as the President of the American Council on the Teaching of Foreign Languages for 2009.

References

External links
Distinguished Faculty Awards IUP Magazine, 2000.
Glisan Elected President of Language Educators Association, ACTFL, January 15, 2008

Indiana University of Pennsylvania
Linguists from the United States
Living people
Women linguists
Year of birth missing (living people)